Park Bom (born March 24, 1984), previously known mononymously as Bom, is a South Korean singer. She is best known as a member of the South Korean girl group 2NE1.

Park began her musical career in 2006, featuring on singles released by labelmates Big Bang, Lexy, and Masta Wu. In 2009, she made her debut as a member of 2NE1 as the main vocalist. The group went on to become one of South Korea's most popular and best-selling girl groups of all time. Park has released two solo singles, "You and I" and "Don't Cry", which reached number one on the Gaon Digital Chart, the national music chart of South Korea. She was awarded Best Digital Single at the 2010 Mnet Asian Music Awards.

Following 2NE1's disbandment in 2016, Park left her group's agency, YG Entertainment, in November 2016. In July 2018, she signed with D-Nation Entertainment and released her comeback single, "Spring", in March 2019. After that, in May 2019, Park Bom released her new repackaged album re: Blue Rose, with the single "4:44" featuring Wheein from Mamamoo.

Early life
Park Bom was born in Seoul, South Korea, on March 24, 1984. Her older sister, Park Go-eun, is a cellist. Whilst attending junior high school in the United States, she was diagnosed with attention-deficit hyperactivity disorder (ADHD).

Career

2006–2013: Career beginnings and breakthrough

Park returned to South Korea to pursue a music career there and repeatedly auditioned to join YG Entertainment, where she was accepted into the company after three years of auditioning according to former YG executive and recording producer Yang Hyun-suk. During her time as a trainee at YG, Park was diagnosed with lymphadenitis; Park has continued to suffer from episodes of lymphadenitis ever since. In 2006, she featured on two of Big Bang's earliest singles, "We Belong Together" and "Forever with U". Park also collaborated with Lexy on "Baby Boy" from her third extended play Rush, and Red Roc on the single "Along My Way". She has also appeared in a series of promotional music videos for Samsung Anycall of the same name, alongside Lee Hyori, G-Dragon, and Gummy. Park was placed as the main vocalist of 2NE1, alongside CL, Dara, and Minzy. The group then collaborated with label-mates Big Bang for the song "Lollipop" before officially debuting on SBS's The Music Trend on May 17, 2009, where they performed "Fire". The group achieved significant success with the number-one single "I Don't Care" from their first extended play, 2NE1, which won them the Song of the Year award at the 2009 Mnet Asian Music Awards, making them the first rookie group to win a daesang in the same year of debut. In August 2009, after finishing promotions for their debut single, the members took a break to focus on individual activities. She released her first solo single "You and I" on October 28, where it became a commercial success and won Best Digital Single at the 2010 Mnet Asian Music Awards.

In late 2010, Park featured on GD & TOP's single "Oh Yeah", appearing on both the Korean and Japanese versions of the song as well as the Japanese music video. The single peaked at number two on the Gaon Chart upon release. On April 21, 2011, she released a second solo digital single, "Don't Cry". The single was a success and achieved a perfect all-kill on Instiz, placing number one on seven local music charts. The same year, Park featured on the song "Having an Affair", performed by G-Dragon and comedian Park Myeong-su in a duo project called GG for the Infinite Challenge Music Festival. The former praised her, saying that "In every song that her voice goes, it's a hit. Her voice is very good". The single was another hit and was the second most downloaded song of 2011. In 2013, Park formed a sub-unit group with labelmate Lee Hi, known as Bom & Hi. The duo released a cover of Mariah Carey's "All I Want for Christmas Is You" on December 17. The same year, she also featured on the Japanese version of G-Dragon's single "Black".

2014–2017: Career setback
In 2014, it was released to the public that Park had been under investigation for drug smuggling (80 Adderall tablets) through international mail in the past. A package, sent by family members residing in the United States to her residing in South Korea, was stopped at Incheon International Airport customs. Park was put under investigation but was never charged. In a statement issued by YG Entertainment's Yang Hyun-suk, he spoke against the allegations of preferential treatment. He explained that the drug was illegal in South Korea but legal in the United States. She was unable to travel to the United States during that time due to her busy schedule. Park contacted her U.S. physician to refill her medication. Yang further explained that Park sought out medical care from South Korean physicians and had undergone therapy for attention deficit hyperactivity disorder but proved to be not as effective as her treatment in the United States. In 2010, at the time of investigation, she had provided the prosecutor her medical records from her U.S. hospital confirming her diagnoses as well as ongoing treatment plan. That same year, Park joined the cast of SBS's Roommate, a reality show which features eleven celebrities living together in a share house. She shortly withdrew from the program following the scandal and went into a hiatus from the entertainment industry.

Park's next appearance was on December 2, 2015, performing with 2NE1 at the 2015 Mnet Asian Music Awards. On November 25, 2016, YG Entertainment announced the disbandment of the group. The company also revealed that former members CL and Dara signed a solo contract, hinting at Park's departure from the company. Park, however, took part in 2NE1's final song "Goodbye", released on January 21, 2017. On April 30, 2017, she announced through social media that she is now under YG Entertainment's subsidiary, The Black Label, and is preparing to release a solo album. On May 1, 2017, the company denied that statement and declared that Park had not signed any new contract with the company or any of their subsidiaries since they broke her contract back in November 2016. She followed up on social media replying to fans that she did sign a contract and she is coming back.

2018–present: Career resurgence
On July 20, 2018, Park reportedly signed an exclusive contract with the newly established entertainment company D-Nation Entertainment. It was planned that she would be releasing her debut mini-album consisting of five to six tracks in November, as well as promotional activities overseas. However, it was reported on October 2, 2018, that the mini-album would instead be released around January 2019 and that Park will be opening a YouTube channel. The following day, it was reported that she would be making her first small screen appearance in four years through YG Future Strategy Office, which stars former labelmate Seungri. Park was featured in the series' third episode, "Music Business", which premiered on October 5, 2018, on Netflix.

[[File:Bom Park spring showcase 2.png|thumb|upright=0.85|Park at Spring'''s showcase event in 2019]]

"Spring" was announced on February 15, 2019, as the lead single off her debut single album of the same name, which was released on March 13, 2019, alongside the premiere of its music video. The song was produced by Brave Brothers and was described as an "R&B song of medium tempo". Additionally, "Spring" features vocals from Park's former groupmate Dara. The song was performed for the first time during Spring's showcase event, which was held on the same day of its release. "Spring" debuted at number two on Billboard's World Digital Song Sales chart as highest-selling K-pop song and highest-charting new entry of that week. Spring was re-released as an extended play titled re:Blue Rose'' on May 2, 2019. The lead single titled "4:44" was produced by the Brave Brothers once again and featured vocals from Wheein. Park released "I Do, I Do" for Perfume as her first soundtrack appearance on July 1, 2019. She held her first fanmeet, billed as "Spring Again", on July 20, 2019. Park competed in Mnet's reality television competition Queendom, which initially aired on August 29, 2019. She released three singles throughout her run in the competition: covers of "Hann (Alone)" by fellow competitor (G)I-dle and "Eyes, Nose, Lips" by former labelmate Taeyang, and an original song titled "Wanna Go Back" , wherein the former features vocals from Cheetah. She ultimately ended in last place in the competition. Park subsequently featured in "Chanel" by MC Mong, which was released on October 29, 2019. She reunited with Dara for the single titled "First Snow', which was released on December 10, 2019.

On December 21, 2020, Park returned from a year-long hiatus with "Red Light", a collaboration with Sai Sai Kham Leng. She released a standalone single titled "Do Re MI Fa Sol", which features vocals from Changmo, on March 31, 2021. On March 11, 2022, Park released a single titled "Flower", which features Kim Min-seok from MeloMance.

On November 2, 2022, D-Nation Entertainment announced that the release of "Remembered" would be postponed to a new later date due to the aftermath of the Seoul Halloween crowd crush.

Filmography

Films

Television

Discography

Single albums

Singles

Soundtrack appearances

Other charted songs

Awards and nominations

Footnotes

References

External links
 

1984 births
Living people
2NE1 members
Berklee College of Music alumni
English-language singers from South Korea
Peabody Institute alumni
Singers from Seoul
South Korean expatriates in the United States
South Korean female dancers
South Korean female idols
South Korean women pop singers
South Korean rhythm and blues singers
MAMA Award winners
YG Entertainment artists
21st-century South Korean singers
21st-century South Korean women singers